The Brak Show is an American adult animated sitcom created by Andy Merrill, Jim Fortier, and Pete Smith for Cartoon Network's late-night programming block, Adult Swim. The Brak Show serves as a spin-off of the animated television series, Space Ghost Coast to Coast, for which the show's creators originally wrote, and featured recurring characters from Space Ghost Coast to Coast and Cartoon Planet. Both programs used stock footage from the Hanna-Barbera cartoon Space Ghost, for which The Brak Show serves as a prequel for. The protagonist is Brak, voiced by Merrill, who developed a quirky persona for the character.

"Leave it to Brak", a pilot episode that serves as an earlier version of the fifth episode "Mr. Bawk Ba Gawk", originally aired prior to the official launch of Adult Swim on Cartoon Network on December 21, 2000. The series made its official premiere debut during the night Adult Swim officially launched on September 2, 2001, and ended on December 31, 2003, with a total of 28 episodes. On May 24, 2007, a webisode for the series was released on Adult Swim Video, ending the series.

Premise
The Brak Show takes place in the fictional town of Spacetown, where Brak lives with his mom, dad, brother, his best pal Zorak, and Thundercleese, his giant robotic warrior neighbor.

History

The Brak Show was preceded by a two-part special titled Brak Presents the Brak Show Starring Brak. Despite the similarities in the titles, the two Brak Shows have very little in common. The specials parodied variety shows, while the series was a spoof of early sitcoms. Each of the specials aired in the United States only once in February and March 2000 respectively.

The series premiered with a sneak peek unannounced in the early hours of December 21, 2000, along with the "Radio Free Sealab" episode of Sealab 2021. This "stealth" pilot (titled "Leave it to Brak") featured hand-drawn backgrounds and different opening titles. The show's official showing was on Adult Swim's debut on September 2, 2001.

It originally started off as a parody of sitcoms which depicts the day-to-day lives of the dysfunctional Guerta family, including Brak, as well as Zorak, various other neighbors, and peers from the local Learnmore High School, but just like its sister show, Aqua Teen Hunger Force, the plot dissolved over time and became increasingly bizarre. The setting is American suburbia with an extra-planetary hint. A Saturn-like planet appears in the background on occasion, and many of the extras are aliens. Often, episodes parody stereotypical episodes of regular sitcoms (e.g., the son showing an interest in women, the dad being reconnected with an old passion, the mother temporarily leaving after a fight, etc.).

The show was canceled in December 2003. However, Adult Swim announced in a bump on October 22, 2006, that The Brak Show would return to production as an internet cartoon on the network's website. On May 24, 2007, a single webisode premiered online, but no further webisodes were produced thereafter, hence serving as the de facto series finale.

On August 1, 2008, Adult Swim had a retro night, an all-night marathon of shows featured on Adult Swim in 2001 and 2002. Two of the earlier episodes of The Brak Show were aired during the marathon. The series has since appeared in Adult Swim's "DVR Theater". Since 2019, Adult Swim has aired The Brak Show as part of "Pete Smith" Day, a yearly event celebrating the career of one of The Brak Shows co-creators.

Characters

 Voldemar H. "Brak" Guerta (Andy Merrill) is a sort of anthropomorphic teenage "space cat" with an eccentric personality and a speaking lisp, who is a freshman at Learnmore High School. He is quite silly and unintelligent but with a very sweet and gentle personality, and seems to be a teen adolescent. He still has attachments to stuffed animals but is starting to be attracted to girls. He frequently breaks into impromptu songs, lyrically about events in the episode. The writers use a wide variety of musical styles for the songs — covering jazz, country, show tunes, rap, and rock & roll. His closest friend is Zorak, although in return Zorak treats him with open contempt and little respect. Brak's character is derived from his appearances on the Space Ghost Coast to Coast spin-off Cartoon Planet.
 Zorak Robert Jones (C. Martin Croker) is another character from Space Ghost Coast to Coast, a middle-aged, 40 year old human-sized mantis who poses as a high school student. On this show, he plays the role similar to that of Eddie Haskell character, who is also a sociopathic, sadistic, morally bankrupt misanthrope. He often hangs out with Brak, but usually only as a way to force him into doing something for his own benefit. Zorak considers himself "above" Brak and his family, and is constantly criticizing and insulting them. Zorak also enjoys bullying Clarence, the neighborhood nerd. Like Eddie Haskell, he also expresses more than a platonic interest in Mom.
 Javier Guerta "Dad" (George Lowe) is a small middle-aged human illegal alien with a Cuban accent, who is extremely self-centered, lazy, and nonsensical. Unemployed since 1984, most of his time is spent sitting at the kitchen table and reading the newspaper. An episode seldom goes by without him delivering "fatherly advice" or a "moral of the story" that is often incoherent or has no relevance to the situation, and typically ends in a non sequitur. Occasionally, he displays prominent womanizing and male-chauvinistic behavior, which is sometimes rebuked by his wife. In an Adult Swim New Year's Eve bumper in 2003, he revealed his name to be "Javier". He is also extremely incompetent at holding a paid job; during his brief stint working at the ice cream shop in “We Ski in Peace” he tries to take his break immediately after the store opens and shoots the ice cream because “it was about to rob [the ice cream store]”. In the same episode, he was also shown to have a high ranking job in protecting the Earth in a base underneath the house, but does so for free. He also cares little for his children, doing things like using Brak's college funds to buy a ski boat.
 Mrs. Guerta "Mom" (Marsha Crenshaw in episodes 1–13, 18, and the webisode, Joanna Daniel in episodes 14–17 and 19–28): a middle-aged creature of the same "species" as Brak, with a more humanoid facial structure and the fashions of a housewife character on a 1950s sitcom. She is largely the only semi-sane character on the show. She displays little romantic or sexual interest in her husband and only tolerates him for her children's sake. When she gets drunk, however, she finds him suddenly irresistible. As voiced by Crenshaw, she is most often an homage to June Cleaver and similar motherly characters, with occasional hints of discontent with her husband's laziness and most importantly, his sexism. When Daniel took over the role, Mom inexplicably acquired a British accent and became far more open in her discontent with domestic life and her annoyance with and disdain for her husband. Her change in accent has been commented upon several times on the show.
 Thundercleese (Carey Means): Brak's next-door neighbor, a militant killbot (with the visual appearance of a Gundam or a similar anime-style robot) who is also passionate about his lawn and garden, particularly the gnomes that decorate it. A short-lived shtick on the show involved Thundercleese blasting Zorak whenever intentionally provoked. He is very aggressive and warlike, always speaking in a loud, robotic monotone. When Brak is troubled, no matter what the problem is, Thundercleese invariably suggests swift and brutal retaliation. Thundercleese's social skills are rather lacking, and before social get-togethers, he will study very bad "party jokes" in preparation. Thundercleese's creator is MoroccoBotix, as shown in an episode of the series, and a special 2003 New Year's Eve event on Adult Swim in 2003 revealed that Aqua Teen Hunger Forces Frylock bought and raised him, which is the in-universe reason for their similar voices.
 Clarence Von Chunkerland (Andy Merrill): a chubby purple alien and schoolmate of Brak's at Learnmore High School. He was a supporting character on the show who made more regular appearances towards the end of the series. Clarence is socially awkward and idolizes Brak. His constant talking often annoys those around him, and when faced with an extremely stressful situation he will wear his mother's sundress and bonnet for comfort. In a rap contest, he revealed that he dearly misses his father, who left them for unknown reasons. In this same contest, he also noted that his mom has since married a man named Gary, whom he does not like. Many of his appearances end with him being maimed, usually by Zorak.
 "Sisto" Guerta: Brak's younger brother, who largely resembles him, although mostly red-colored. In early episodes, he would make random appearances walking across the scene farting. He was killed by aliens in "Pepper". A scratch-sniff card of Sisto was shown in the episode "Sexy New Brak Show Go".

Episodes

International broadcast
In Canada, The Brak Show previously aired on Teletoon's Teletoon at Night block, and is airing on the Canadian version of Adult Swim.

Home releases
The first 14 episodes were released on DVD on February 1, 2005, and the remaining episodes were released on August 8, 2006. In addition to being available on DVD, The Brak Show is also available on iTunes.

The series has also been available on HBO Max since September 1, 2020.

References

External links

 
 

 
2000s American adult animated television series
2000s American parody television series
2000s American surreal comedy television series
2000s American sitcoms
2000 American television series debuts
2003 American television series endings
American adult animated comedy television series
Animated adult television sitcoms
Adult Swim original programming
American adult animated television spin-offs
American animated sitcoms
American television series with live action and animation
Animated television series about cats
Animated television series about dysfunctional families
Space Ghost Coast to Coast
English-language television shows
Space Ghost television series
Television series created by Jim Fortier
Television series by Williams Street